"Lights & Music" is a song by Australian electronic music band Cut Copy, released as the second single from their second studio album, In Ghost Colours (2008). It is the band's most successful single to date, peaking at number 64 on the Australian Singles Chart. It was included in the video games FIFA 09 and Forza Horizon 3.

Track listings
Australian CD single
"Lights & Music" (Album Version) – 4:37
"Lights & Music" (Boys Noize Happy Birthday Remix) – 5:17
"Lights & Music" (Superdiscount Remix) – 7:03
"Lights & Music" (video)

Australian and UK iTunes EP
"Lights & Music" (Single Version) – 4:59
"Lights & Music" (Boys Noize Remix) – 5:17
"Lights & Music" (Superdiscount Remix) – 7:03

Australian limited edition 12" single
A. "Lights & Music" (Boys Noize Remix) – 5:16
B. "Lights & Music" (Superdiscount Remix) – 7:04

UK CD single
"Lights & Music" (Single Version) – 4:59
"Lights & Music" (Boys Noize Happy Birthday Remix) – 5:17
"Lights & Music" (Superdiscount Remix) – 7:03
"Lights & Music" (video)

UK 7" single
A. "Lights & Music"

UK 12" single
A1. "Lights & Music" (Original)
A2. "Lights & Music" (Superdiscount Remix) – 7:03
B1. "Lights & Music" (Boys Noize Happy Birthday Remix) – 5:17

UK iTunes single
"Lights & Music" (Radio Edit) – 3:38

Personnel
Credits adapted from CD single liner notes.
 Cut Copy – production
 Alter – artwork, layout
 Eric Broucek – engineering
 John Fields – mixing (original version)
 Tim Goldsworthy – additional programming, production
 Nilesh Patel – mastering

Charts

Weekly charts

Year-end charts

Release history

References

2008 singles
2008 songs
Cut Copy songs
Modular Recordings singles